Rakityansky District is an administrative district (raion), one of the twenty-one in Belgorod Oblast, Russia. As a municipal division, it is incorporated as Rakityansky Municipal District. It is located in the west of the oblast. Its administrative center is the urban locality (a work settlement) of Rakitnoye. Population:   35,031 (2002 Census);  The population of Rakitnoye accounts for 30.2% of the district's total population.

References

Notes

Sources

Districts of Belgorod Oblast